Bresso is a comune (municipality) in the Metropolitan City of Milan in the Italian region Lombardy, located about  north of Milan. At the 2001 census the municipality had a population of 26,255 inhabitants and a population density of 8,027.2 persons/km², making it the most densely populated comune in Italy outside the Province of Naples.

Bresso borders the following municipalities: Cinisello Balsamo, Cusano Milanino, Sesto San Giovanni, Cormano and Milan.

Milan's general aviation airfield is located at Bresso and is the home of the Aero Club Milano  and Aero Club Bresso.

Transport
Bresso Airport is in the commune.

References

External links
 Official website

Cities and towns in Lombardy